Ditrigona sacra is a moth in the family Drepanidae. It was described by Arthur Gardiner Butler in 1878. It is found in Japan and Korea.

The wingspan is 11.5-17.5 mm for males and 14-19.5 mm for females. The forewings and hindwings are weakly lustrous and white, the forewings have the costa white or very pale buff. The fasciae are brownish buff, the antemedial fascia angled at the posterior edge of the cell, the postmedial fascia lunulate. There is a brown spot at the distal end of the cell and at the ends of each vein. The hindwings are as the forewings, except that there is no antemedial fascia.

References

Moths described in 1878
Drepaninae
Moths of Asia